El Zarqa is a city in Damietta Governorate, Egypt. Its population in 2005 was 17,741.

See also
 List of cities and towns in Egypt

References 

Populated places in Damietta Governorate